Lomanotus marmoratus is a species of a sea slug, a marine gastropod mollusc in the family Lomanotidae.

Distribution 
This species was described from Berry Head, Torbay on the south coast of England. It has been reported from Atlantic coasts from Great Britain to Spain to Great Britain and also from the Mediterranean Sea.

Ecology 
Lomanotus marmoratus feeds on the hydroid Nemertesia antennina family Plumulariidae.

References

External links 
 Marine Life of Britain and Ireland Encyclopedia account.

Lomanotidae
Gastropods described in 1845